Gentle Annie is a film with a Western theme, directed in 1944 by Andrew Marton, starring Donna Reed and James Craig. Marjorie Main played the role of Annie Goss. A notable actor in this film is Harry Morgan, who plays Cottonwood Goss. Morgan is best known for his role as Col. Potter in the TV show M*A*S*H.

Plot
A frontierswoman turns her family into a band of bank robbers.

Cast
 James Craig as Lloyd Richland aka Rich Williams
 Donna Reed as Mary Lingen
 Marjorie Main as Annie Goss
 Harry Morgan as Cottonwood Goss (credited as Henry Morgan)
 Paul Langton as Violet Goss
 Barton MacLane as Sheriff Tatum
 John Philliber as Barrow
 Morris Ankrum as Deputy Gansby
 Frank Darien as Jake
 Lee Shumway as Fireman (uncredited)

Production notes
Hollywood Reporter news items and MGM publicity material provide the following information about the production: MGM purchased MacKinlay Kantor's novel in February 1942. Filming began on October 6, 1942, but when director W. S. Van Dyke became ill in early November 1942, production was halted. Tay Garnett was to take over direction on November 9, 1942, but the project was shelved and not revived until June 1944.

The 1942 version was produced by Sam Zimbalist and starred Robert Taylor as Lloyd Richland, Susan Peters as Mary Lingen, Spring Byington as Annie Goss, Charles Grapewin as Barrow and Morris Ankrum as the sheriff. When the project was revived in 1944, the script was rewritten and all the principal crew and cast, except Ankrum and Craig, were replaced.

Production dates: August 7 — early September 1944. Additional scenes began late September 1944.

John Philliber, who plays Barrow in the film, died on November 8, 1944, shortly after filming ended. Gentle Annie was his last picture.

See also
 List of American films of 1944

References

External links 
 
 
 
 

1944 films
1944 Western (genre) films
1940s romance films
American Western (genre) films
American black-and-white films
American romance films
Films based on works by MacKinlay Kantor
Films directed by Andrew Marton
Metro-Goldwyn-Mayer films
1940s American films